Ice hockey is a minor sport that is gaining popularity in United Arab Emirates. The premier ice hockey league in the UAE is the Emirates Ice Hockey League (EHL), which began in 2009. The U.A.E. Ice Hockey Association is one of the few sports associations recognized by the United Arab Emirates government.

In 2018, Vladimir Burdun was appointed as the new president of the EHL. His role was to strengthen the UAE ice hockey team and attract more business opportunities.

In 2019, Burdun announced the goal of entering a team into the Kontinental Hockey League (KHL), which formerly involved teams from Belarus, China, Finland, Latvia, Kazakhstan, and Russia, by 2021. He also aimed at getting more players ready for the KHL. A new ice arena was expected to open in Abu Dhabi in 2019, designed to meet all the requirements of the KHL. The plan was to replicate the recent success of a NHL team situated in the desert, Vegas Golden Knights. NHL and KHL stars such as Pavel Datsyuk, Sergei Mozyakin, Alexander Ovechkin were discussed as possible additions to the league to increase competitiveness.

References